Pascual Madoz Ibáñez (May 17, 1806 – December 13, 1870), Spanish politician, statistician, was born at Pamplona.

Biography

In early life Madoz was settled in Barcelona, as a writer and journalist. He envisioned the construction of the Vielha tunnel. He joined the Progresista party formed during the First Carlist War, 1833–40. He saw some service against the Carlists; was elected deputy to the Cortes of 1836; took part for Baldomero Espartero, Count of Luchana, and then against him; was imprisoned in 1843; went into exile and returned; was governor of Barcelona in 1854, and minister of finance in 1855; had a large share in secularizing the Church lands; and after the revolution of 1868 was governor of Madrid. He had, however, no great influence as a leader and soon went abroad, dying at Genoa in 1870.He was later interred in the Montjuïc Cemetery in Barcelona.

Madoz was distinguished from most of the politicians of his generation by the fact that in middle life he compiled what is still a book of value a geographical, statistical and historical dictionary of Spain and its possessions overseas, Diccionario geográfico, estadístico y histórico de España, y sus posesiones de Ultramar (Madrid, 1848–1850).

Monuments
In Pamplona there is a street, Calle de Pascual Madoz, named in his honor.

Notes

References 
 

1806 births
1870 deaths
People from Pamplona
Presidents of the Congress of Deputies (Spain)
Economy and finance ministers of Spain
Prime Ministers of Spain
Government ministers of Spain
Spanish statisticians
Civil governors of Madrid